Tulloch (foaled in New Zealand in 1954 and died in 1969) was a champion Australian Thoroughbred racehorse who was one of the greatest Australian stayers.

He won at distances from 5 furlongs (1,000 metres) to 2 miles (3,200 m), established Australian records at 10 furlongs (1960 Cox Plate) and 12 furlongs (1957 Caulfield Cup), and took 2 seconds off Phar Lap's 28-year-old record for the AJC Derby. As a three-year-old Tulloch won 14 of his 16 starts before he was struck down by a virus which kept him off the racing scene for almost two years. He returned to racing as an autumn five-year-old and won 15 of his last 24 races.

Tulloch was one of the five inaugural horse inductees into the Australian Racing Hall of Fame, alongside Carbine, Phar Lap, Bernborough and Kingston Town. Tulloch is also an inductee in the New Zealand Racing Hall of Fame.

Background
Tulloch was a bay or brown colt foaled in 1954 at Trelawney Stud, Cambridge, New Zealand. He was by the good racehorse and sire, Khorassan out of the race winner, Florida by Salmagundi (GB). Khorassan (IRE) was the sire of 18 stakeswinners with 65 stakeswins, mostly in New Zealand. Florida was also the dam of Tallahassee Lassie (unraced) and Tulloch's Sister (a multiple metropolitan race winner), before she was exported to the US.

Racing career
Trainer Tommy J. Smith bought Tulloch as a yearling for 750 guineas in 1956 at the Trentham Yearling Sales. He offered the colt to E.A. Haley who was impressed by the horse's breeding, intelligence and presence despite having what was referred to as a "swampy" back. Haley named him Tulloch after the Scottish town where his mother was born.

1956/1957: Two-Year-Old Season
Tulloch made his debut in the Breeders' Plate in the spring of 1956 where he was the favourite but was defeated by Flying Kurana. A week later, Tulloch won the Canonbury Stakes.

He was then sent to Melbourne where he raced three times, winning twice but defeated in the Maribyrnong Plate by Concert Star.

Resuming in the autumn, Tulloch was placed second in his first two starts, a 2yo handicap in Sydney and the Merson Cooper Stakes.

He then won the seven furlong VRC Sires Produce Stakes, defeating Ace High. In his next start, dropping back a furlong, Ace High turned the tables on Tulloch in the Ascot Vale Stakes.

Returning to Sydney, Tulloch won the Fairfield Handicap at Warwick Farm Racecourse before meeting only two other horses in the AJC Sires Produce Stakes. Todman and Prince Darius were to prove themselves as worthy foes, however were no match for Tulloch, who at this stage was undefeated at seven furlongs. Todman turned the tables in the Champagne Stakes (dropping back to 6F) beating Tulloch by six lengths. Before heading for a spell, Smith and Tulloch travelled to Brisbane where Tulloch won the QTC Sires Produce Stakes.

His record at the end of his 2yo season stood at 13:7-6-0. Tulloch had won the VRC, AJC and QTC Sires Produce Stakes, the Cannonbury Stakes as well as 2yo races at Caulfield, Flemington and Warwick Farm Racecourse. He also ran second in the Maribyrnong Plate, AJC Breeders Plate, Ascot Vale Stakes and the Champagne Stakes.

1957/1958: Three-Year-Old Season
Resuming in the Warwick Stakes in 1957, Tulloch took on open age competition for the first time beating MacDougal (winner of the Metropolitan Handicap and Melbourne Cup), Monte Carlo (AJC Derby and VRC Derby and LKS Mackinnon Stakes) and Caranna (AJC Derby, Caulfield Guineas and Rosehill Guineas). Next he went back to his own age group in the Rosehill Guineas, where he beat Prince Darius, then onto the AJC Derby, in which Tulloch beat Prince Darius (again) by six lengths and in the process broke the track record by 2.1 seconds that had been held by Phar Lap since 1929. Tulloch then made the trip down to Melbourne to win the Caulfield Guineas and then took on the older horses again in the Caulfield Cup. Tulloch started 6/4 on favourite in a field of 17, carrying 7 stone 8 pounds (approx 48 kg) Tulloch won in 2:26.9, which at the time was the fastest time in the world for a mile and a half on turf and the third fastest overall. He won by two lengths from Mac's Amber (Chipping Norton Stakes and Toorak Handicap) and Sailor's Guide (AJC Derby, LKS Mackinnon Stakes as well as the Washington, D.C. International in the USA). Tulloch's Caulfield Cup time of 2:26.9 for a mile and a half (2414 meters) stood for 43 years until in 2000 when Diatribe ran 2:25.32 for 2400 meters lowering Tulloch's time by .73 (73/100) of a second, however, no 3-year-old horse in recorded history has ever covered one and one half miles on turf carrying that weight faster than Tulloch.

Tulloch was installed as favourite for the Melbourne Cup - it was rumoured that Smith had a wager of £33,000 to £1,000 that Tulloch would win the Cups double. A Sydney newspaper ran a story on the Monday after the Caulfield Cup that quoted the owner EA Haley as saying that Tulloch would never run in the Melbourne Cup as he did not fancy running 3yos over two miles, especially with the  burden he had been allotted. The rest of the newspapers were full of Tommy Smith predicting how far Tulloch would win the Cup by and the debate raged leading up to the race if the great horse would run or not. Whilst the controversy ensured an exciting lead up to the Cup, Tulloch won the VRC Derby, beating Prince Darius by eight lengths.

Scratched from the Melbourne Cup, punters were left to wonder what might have been, as Straight Draw downed Prince Darius by a neck with Pandie Sun a further 2½ lengths further back in third. The weight for age (w.f.a.) CB Fisher Plate was next on the agenda with Tulloch easily accounting for Sailors Guide, before he was taken seven days later to Brisbane for the QTC Derby, which he won by seven lengths.

Returning in the autumn, Prince Darius defeated Tulloch in the St George Stakes over nine furlongs, Prince Darius again beat Tulloch in the VRC Queen Elizabeth Stakes over 12F, but the winner was another old adversary, Sailors Guide. Third up Tulloch won the VRC St Leger, before heading to Sydney to win the Rawson Stakes, Chipping Norton Stakes, AJC St Leger, All Aged Stakes and the AJC Queen Elizabeth Stakes.

Tulloch had 16 starts for 14 wins, one second and one third as a three-year-old. His lifetime record now stood at 29: 21-7-1. His fame had spread and Haley refused massive overseas offers for his horse. Grand plans were formulated to campaign Tulloch in the United States and England, but in April 1958, Tulloch developed a mysterious stomach disease that almost killed him. Over the next two years Tulloch suffered recurring infections and severe weight loss.

1959/1960: Five-Year-Old Season
Remarkably, Tulloch returned to the track on 12 March 1960 - almost two years after he first became sick. First up in the VRC Queens Plate over 10 Furlongs, Tulloch defeated Lord, (who won the Caulfield Guineas (thrice), Caulfield Stakes (thrice), Memsie Stakes (4 times), St George Stakes (twice), C F Orr Stakes (twice), Underwood Stakes (twice)), by a short head. Tulloch then won the Chipping Norton Stakes, Craven Plate and the P.J. O'Shea Stakes to finish off a successful autumn return.

The 1960 Melbourne Cup was the aim in the spring, and in his lead up Tulloch won the Cox Plate, LKS Mackinnon Stakes and VRC Queens Plate. Under 10 stone 1 pound (approx 64 kg) in the Melbourne Cup and starting 3/1 favourite, Tulloch finished an unlucky seventh, the race being won by Hi Jinx. This was to be Tulloch's only unplaced run in his career and also one of the worst rides by top jockey Neville Sellwood who had Tulloch positioned 60 lengths behind the leader with six furlongs (1200 metres) to go and left his run too late. After the Cup Tulloch again took out the CB Fisher Plate.

Returning for the autumn Tulloch won the AJC Autumn Stakes and the AJC Queen Elizabeth Stakes before going to Brisbane where he again won the P.J. O'Shea Stakes. His last race was the 1961 Brisbane Cup which he won by 1¾ lengths.

After returning from his debilitating illness, Tulloch had a record of 24: 15-5-3 with 1 unplaced run. Thirteen of these wins were at w.f.a. in principal (stakes) races.

At the end of his career, Tulloch had won 19 Group One races. He also twice won the no longer contested Autumn Stakes (with winners such as Ming Dynasty, Balmerino, Gunsynd, Rain Lover, Galilee, Beau Vite, Peter Pan, Nightmarch, Heroic, and Carbine), as well as the no longer contested VRC Queens Plate (winners such as Leilani, Gunsynd, Rain Lover, Galilee, Lord, Ajax, Phar Lap, Wallace, and Carbine), both of which would be categorised as Group One races by today's standard. Seven races that Tulloch won are now Group 2 races and two are Group 3. The VRC St Leger (now only a listed race) and AJC St Leger were principal (stakes) races in Tulloch's era, which indicates how impressive his record was then.

Race Record

 In April 1958 Tulloch contracted a stomach virus which was so severe as to bring the horse close to death. Tulloch did not race for almost two years. It was not until 12 March 1960 that Tulloch returned to racing as a five-year-old.

 Total: 53 starts: 36 wins, 12 seconds, 4 thirds, 1 unplaced.

Stud record
Tulloch stood at Haley's Te Koona Stud where he did not perform up to his racetrack standard. He sired two stakes winners, in Dahma Star (1967 Christmas Cup) and Valide (1968 SA Oaks). Tulloch died at Old Gowang Stud near Coonabarabran on 30 June 1969.

Honours
Tulloch was one of the five inaugural inductees into the Australian Racing Hall of Fame, and was also inducted into the New Zealand Racing Hall of Fame. In 1978 he was honoured on a postage stamp issued by Australia Post.

Pedigree

See also
 Thoroughbred racing in New Zealand
 List of leading Thoroughbred racehorses
 Repeat winners of horse races

References

Notes

Bibliography

External links
 Australian Racing Museum and Hall of Fame
 Thoroughbred Heritage - Tulloch
 Tulloch's pedigree and stats

1954 racehorse births
1969 racehorse deaths
Australian Racing Hall of Fame horses
New Zealand Racing Hall of Fame horses
Caulfield Cup winners
Cox Plate winners
Victoria Derby winners
Racehorses bred in New Zealand
Racehorses trained in Australia
Sport in Cambridge, New Zealand
Thoroughbred family 24